Sergi Puig Herrera (born 19 November 1998) is a Spanish footballer who plays as a goalkeeper for CE Sabadell FC.

Club career

Barcelona
Puig was born in Premià de Mar, Barcelona, Catalonia, and joined FC Barcelona's La Masia in 2013, from UE Vilassar de Mar. On 1 April 2017, while still a youth, he made his senior debut with the reserves by starting in a 12–0 Segunda División B home routing of CD Eldense.

On 12 August 2017, after finishing his formation, Puig was loaned to Tercera División side CE L'Hospitalet. On 24 August of the following year, he renewed his contract with Barça until 2020, and moved to UB Conquense in the third division also in a temporary deal.

Back at the B-team for the 2019–20 campaign, Puig acted as a backup to Iñaki Peña before leaving on 30 June 2020 as his contract expired.

Las Palmas
On 25 September 2020, Puig signed for UD Las Palmas, being initially assigned to the B-side in division three. He featured regularly for the B's while also being a third-choice in the main squad, behind Álvaro Valles and Álex Domínguez.

Ponferradina
On 21 July 2021, Puig agreed to a contract with SD Ponferradina of the Segunda División. A third-choice behind fellow new signings Amir Abedzadeh and Lucho García, he made his club debut on 1 December, starting in a 2–0 away success over CP Cacereño in the season's Copa del Rey.

Puig made his professional debut on 15 December 2021, starting in a 2–1 home win over UD Ibiza, also in the national cup. He made his league debut the following 27 March, starting in a 3–1 away loss against CD Mirandés.

Sabadell
On 16 July 2022, free agent Puig joined Primera Federación side CE Sabadell FC.

References

External links

1998 births
Living people
People from Premià de Mar
Sportspeople from the Province of Barcelona
Spanish footballers
Footballers from Catalonia
Association football goalkeepers
Segunda División players
Segunda División B players
Tercera División players
FC Barcelona Atlètic players
CE L'Hospitalet players
UB Conquense footballers
UD Las Palmas Atlético players
SD Ponferradina players
CE Sabadell FC footballers